Nwachukwu Iheukwumere Chima Moneke (born 24 December 1995) is a Nigerian-Australian professional basketball player for AS Monaco Basket of the French LNB Pro A and the EuroLeague. At 1.96 m. tall, he plays at the power forward position. He also represents the Nigerian national team in international competition.

Early life 

He was born in Abuja, Nigeria, before moving to Canberra, Australia to begin schooling. His parents, Sydney and Eucharia Moneke, were diplomats of the Nigerian Embassy. He attended Farrer Primary School before traveling again throughout the world.

College career 

In 2013, he enrolled at Northeast Community College in Norfolk, Nebraska, where he stayed for two seasons (2013-15). In his sophomore season he averaged 17 ppg and 12.1 rpg which led the team to a 25-7 record.

He then transferred to the University of California at Davis. After his redshirt season, he led the Aggies to an NCAA tournament berth for the first time in school history in the 2016-17 season. He was named Big West Conference tournament MVP. In the tournament they defeated NC Central in the play-in game where Moneke had 18 points and 12 rebounds. They would go on to lose to the #1 overall seed Kansas, where Chima finished with 20 points and 9 rebounds. He averaged 14.6 points, 9.5 rebounds and 1.4 blocks per game with 14 double-doubles

In the 2017-18 season, with the UC Davis Aggies he averaged 18.4 points, 9.6 rebounds and 1.1 blocks per performance in 21 games.

Professional career

France (2018–2021) 
After not being selected in the 2018 NBA Draft, he signed his first professional contract with the Rouen Métropole Basket of the French LNB Pro B. After the season, Moneke signed with the South East Melbourne Phoenix of the Australian NBL before it was blown off due to problems with his passport.

In November 2018, he would leave Rouen Métropole Basket to sign for Denain Voltaire Basket, also from the French LNB Pro B. He averaged 14.3 points, 6.6 rebounds and 1.7 assists in 27 games.

In the 2019–20 season, he signed for the Béliers de Kemper of the French LNB Pro B, in which he averaged 15.8 points, 6.75 rebounds and 1.7 assists per game. The season was cancelled early due to the COVID-19 pandemic in France.

In the 2020–21 season, he signed for the Orléans Loiret Basket of the LNB Pro A, with averages of 12.5 points, 6 rebounds, 1.8 assists and almost a block per performance in the 21 games played.

Manresa (2021–2022) 
On July 13, 2021, Moneke signed a one-year-deal with the Bàsquet Manresa of the Spanish Liga Endesa and the Basketball Champions League (BCL). He helped Manresa to a surprising season in the BCL as they reached the final where they lost to Tenerife in the final. Moneke was named the MVP of the 2021–22 season after averaging 13.1 points per game.
In the Spanish ACB, Moneke was named to the ALL-ACB 1st team after leading Manresa to the playoffs. He averaged 14.8 points per game on 53% percent shooting. He was second in the entire league in rebounding with 8.4 per game. He led the entire league in total steals (56), steals per game (1.6) and defensive rebounds.

Sacramento Kings (2022–2023) 
On July 18, 2022, Moneke signed with the Sacramento Kings, uniting with Nigeria's national team coach Mike Brown. On January 6, 2023, Moneke was waived by the Kings.

Monaco (2023–present) 
On January 16, 2023, he signed with AS Monaco Basket of the LNB Pro A.

National team career 
He debuted with the Nigeria men's national basketball team in 2020, playing three qualifying matches for the Afrobasket. In 2021, he was summoned for the pre-selection to compete in the 2020 Summer Olympics.

Career statistics

NBA

Regular season

|-
| style="text-align:left;"|
| style="text-align:left;"|Sacramento
| 2 || 0 || 4.0 || .500 ||  || .000 || 1.0 || .5 || .0 || .0 || 1.0

College

|-
| style="text-align:left;"| 2015–16
| style="text-align:left;"| UC Davis
| style="text-align:center;" colspan="11"|  Redshirt
|-
| style="text-align:left;"| 2016–17
| style="text-align:left;"| UC Davis
| 36 || 33 || 27.3 || .527 ||  || .645 || 9.5 || .8 || .9 || 1.4 || 14.6
|-
| style="text-align:left;"| 2017–18
| style="text-align:left;"| UC Davis
| 21 || 21 || 30.0 || .515 || .375 || .714 || 9.6 || 1.0 || 1.0 || 1.1 || 18.4
|- class="sortbottom"
| style="text-align:center;" colspan="2"| Career
| 57 || 54 || 28.3 || .522 || .375 || .674 || 9.5 || .9 || .9 || 1.3 || 16.0

Personal  
Moneke attended Canberra High School and Lake Ginninderra College in Canberra, Australia where he played high school basketball with Dante Exum.

References

External links 
 Chima Moneke at RealGM
 FIBA
 UC Davis Aggies bio

1995 births
Living people
Australian men's basketball players
Bàsquet Manresa players
Denain Voltaire Basket players
Junior college men's basketball players in the United States
Liga ACB players
National Basketball Association players from Nigeria
Nigerian expatriate basketball people in France
Nigerian expatriate basketball people in Spain
Nigerian men's basketball players
Orléans Loiret Basket players
People from Abuja
Power forwards (basketball)
Rouen Métropole Basket players
Sacramento Kings players
Stockton Kings players
UC Davis Aggies men's basketball players
Undrafted National Basketball Association players